Tarantella is a five-minute color, avant-garde animated short film created by Mary Ellen Bute, a pioneer of visual music and electronic art in experimental cinema.

With piano accompaniment by Edwin Gerschefski, "Tarantella" features rich reds and blues that Bute uses to signify a lighter mood, while her syncopated spirals, shards, lines and squiggles dance exuberantly to Gerschefski’s modern beat. Bute produced more than a dozen short films between the 1930s and the 1950s and once described herself as a "designer of kinetic abstractions" who sought to "bring to the eyes a combination of visual forms unfolding with the … rhythmic cadences of music." Bute’s work influenced many other filmmakers working with abstract animation during the 1930s and 1940s, and with experimental electronic imagery in the 1950s.

In 2010, the film was selected for listing in the National Film Registry by the Library of Congress.

References

External links 
Tarantella essay  by Lauren Rabinovitz at National Film Registry

1940 films
1940 animated films
1940 short films
1940s American animated films
1940s animated short films
Abstract animation
American avant-garde and experimental films
United States National Film Registry films
Visual music
1940s English-language films